The 2011 winners of the Torneo di Viareggio (in English, the Viareggio Tournament, officially the Viareggio Cup World Football Tournament Coppa Carnevale), the annual youth football tournament held in Viareggio, Tuscany, are listed below.

Format 

The 48 teams are seeded in 12 pools, split up into 6-pool groups. Each team from a pool meets the others in a single tie. The winning club from each pool and two best runners-up from both group A and group B progress to the final knockout stage. All matches in the final rounds are single tie. The Round of 16 after envisions penalties and no extra time, while the rest of the final round matches include 30 minutes extra time and penalties to be played if the draw between teams still holds.

Participating teams
Italian teams

  Atalanta
  Cesena
  Empoli
  Entella
  Fiorentina
  Genoa
  Inter Milan
  Juventus
  Lazio
  Lecce
  Lumezzane
  Napoli
  A.S.D. Città di Marino
  Milan
  Palermo
  Parma
  Poggibonsi
  Prato
  Serie D Representatives
  Reggina
  Roma
  Sambenedettese
  Sampdoria
  Sassuolo
  Siena
  Spezia
  Taranto
  Torino
  Varese
  Viareggio
  Vicenza

European teams

  Anderlecht
  Bruges
  Dukla Praga
  Grasshoppers
  Jedinstvo Ub
  Midtjylland
  Newcastle United
  Nordsjaelland
  Spartak Mosca
  Stabaek
  Red Star

African teams

  Emergence Brera
  Kallon

Asian teams
  Grampus

American teams

  Nacional Asunción
  L.I.A.C. New York

Oceanian teams
  APIA Leichhardt

Group stage

Group A

Pool 1

Pool 2

Pool 3

Pool 4

Pool 5

Pool 6

Group B

Pool 7

Pool 8

Pool 9

Pool 10

Pool 11

Pool 12

Knockout stage

Champions

Top goal scorers 

7 goals

  Giuseppe De Luca ( Varese)
  Simone Dell'Agnello ( Inter Milan)

5 goals

  Denis Alibec ( Inter Milan)
  Simone Zaza ( Sampdoria)
  Pietro Iemmello ( Fiorentina)

Notes

External links
Official Site (Italian)
Results on RSSSF.COM

Torneo di Viareggio
2011 in association football
2010–11 in Italian football

it:Torneo di Viareggio 2010